Affable may refer to:
 Charles VIII of France, "the Affable" (1470–1498)
 Affable Records

See also
 Affable savages, a book by Francis Huxley